Kahshe Lake is a lake in the Muskoka region in Ontario, Canada near Gravenhurst.

Kahshe is the forth largest lake in the region and has approximately 600 cottages. The lake is tea-coloured, containing a high level of dissolved organics.

Name
The lake name Ka-shesheb-agam-ag is a First Nations term that may mean '''where there are-ducks-lake-place', thus 'Lake of Many Ducks'; compare Ojibwe jishib'' 'duck'; the following are spurious (Carl Masthay, St. Louis, 2009): Kah-Lake, She-Many, Bog-Ducks,a-and, Mog or Maug-Loons, therefore Lake of Many Many Ducks and Loons (researched by Ken Little). Other people claim that it means Lake of Many Islands or "Lake of Healing Waters".

Description 
The west side of Kahshe Lake is shallow while the east side is deep.  Both areas have many shallow rock hazards with no marker buoys, though in recent years a community initiative to install rock markers across the lake has helped with rock hazard visibility. A public beach, boating docks and a boat launch are located off North Kahshe Lake Road.

Events
Kahshe Lake has been featured on fishing shows and in a Tim Hortons television commercial.  Residents have been staging the Kahshe Lake regatta, for over fifty years.  Lake Kahshe also has barn dances, a Labour Day concert, and the Rockhaven Inn craft sale. As well as the bi-yearly Muskoka Seaflea Fleafest event.

See also
List of lakes in Ontario

References

Lakes of the District Municipality of Muskoka